Cumberland County is a county in the U.S. state of Maine. As of the 2020 census, the population was 303,069, making it the most populous county in Maine. Its county seat is Portland. Cumberland County was founded in 1760 from a portion of York County, Province of Massachusetts Bay, and named for William, Duke of Cumberland, a son of King George II. Cumberland County has the deepest and second-largest body of water in the state, Sebago Lake, which supplies tap water to most of the county. The county is the state's economic and industrial center, having the resources of the Port of Portland, the Maine Mall, and having corporate headquarters of major companies such as Fairchild Semiconductor, IDEXX Laboratories, Unum, and TD Bank. Cumberland County is part of the Portland–South Portland, ME Metropolitan Statistical Area.

Geography

Adjacent counties
Androscoggin County – north
Oxford County – northwest
Sagadahoc County – northeast
York County – southwest

Major highways

 U.S. Route 202
 U.S. Route 302
 U.S. 1
 Maine State Route 9
 Maine State Route 77
 Maine State Route 114

National protected area
 Rachel Carson National Wildlife Refuge (part)

Demographics

2000 census
As of the 2000 census, there were 265,612 people, 107,989 households, and 67,709 families living in the county. There were 122,600 housing units at an average density of 147 per square mile (57/km2). The racial makeup of the county was 95.74% White, 1.06% Black or African American, 0.29% Native American, 1.40% Asian, 0.04% Pacific Islander, 0.35% from other races, and 1.13% from two or more races.  0.95% of the population were Hispanic or Latino of any race.

There were 107,989 households, out of which 30.10% had children under the age of 18 living with them, 50.10% were married couples living together, 9.50% had a female householder with no husband present, and 37.30% were non-families. 28.40% of all households were made up of individuals, and 10.20% had someone living alone who was 65 years of age or older.  The average household size was 2.38 and the average family size was 2.95.

In the county, the population was spread out, with 23.30% under the age of 18, 8.40% from 18 to 24, 31.30% from 25 to 44, 23.60% from 45 to 64, and 13.30% who were 65 years of age or older.  The median age was 38 years. For every 100 females, there were 93.80 males.  For every 100 females age 18 and over, there were 90.20 males.

The median income for a household in the county was $44,048, and the median income for a family was $54,485. Males had a median income of $35,850 versus $27,935 for females. The per capita income for the county was $23,949.  About 5.20% of families and 7.90% of the population were below the poverty line, including 9.10% of those under age 18 and 7.40% of those age 65 or over.

19.6% were of English, 15.5% Irish, 9.6% French, 7.8% United States or American, 7.7% Italian, 6.3% French Canadian and 5.9% German ancestry according to Census 2000. 94.4% spoke English and 2.1% French as their first language.

2010 census
As of the 2010 United States Census, there were 281,674 people, 117,339 households, and 70,778 families living in the county. The racial makeup of the county was 92.8% white, 2.4% black or African American, 2.0% Asian, 0.3% American Indian, 0.6% from other races, and 1.8% from two or more races. Those of Hispanic or Latino origin made up 1.8% of the population. In terms of ancestry, 22.7% were English, 21.1% were Irish, 9.0% were German, 8.4% were Italian, 6.0% were Scottish, 5.5% were French Canadian, and 4.4% were American.

Of the 117,339 households, 28.3% had children under the age of 18 living with them, 46.8% were married couples living together, 9.7% had a female householder with no husband present, 39.7% were non-families, and 29.7% of all households were made up of individuals. The average household size was 2.32 and the average family size was 2.90. The median age was 41.0 years.

The median income for a household in the county was $55,658 and the median income for a family was $71,335. Males had a median income of $48,158 versus $38,539 for females. The per capita income for the county was $31,041. About 6.9% of families and 10.5% of the population were below the poverty line, including 14.4% of those under age 18 and 7.5% of those age 65 or over.

Government

Cumberland County is represented by county commissioners and the daily operations are run by a county manager. The county has several responsibilities, including running a Sheriff's department, the Cumberland County Jail, and a county court system. Cumberland County also has its own treasury department, emergency management agency and also has a district attorney office. The county also has a stake in the Cross Insurance Arena (formerly called the Cumberland County Civic Center), as well as programs in local economic development and tourism.

Cumberland County is divided into five districts of approximate equal population, each of which elects one county commissioner. The sheriff is elected countywide and runs the Cumberland County Sheriff's office and the Cumberland County Jail.

Politics
Like the rest of Maine, Cumberland County was a solid Republican county after the Civil War. Between 1860 and 1960, the Republican presidential nominee won Cumberland County in every election except 1912 when the county was won by Democrat Woodrow Wilson following a split in the Republican vote between incumbent president William Howard Taft and Progressive nominee, the former Republican president Theodore Roosevelt. The county remained steadfastly and overwhelmingly Republican even in Franklin D. Roosevelt's huge Democratic landslide win in 1936.

In 1964 Democrat Lyndon B. Johnson won Cumberland County and Maine's 15 other counties as part of a 44-state landslide over controversial Republican nominee Barry Goldwater. Cumberland remained in the Democratic column in 1968, backing Hubert H. Humphrey, who had chosen Maine Senator Edmund Muskie as his running mate. These Democratic victories were a sign of things to come for Cumberland County. Though it would snap back into the Republican column for Richard Nixon in 1972, Republican victories in Cumberland grew increasingly narrower with Republican Gerald Ford winning it by less than 2,000 votes over Democrat Jimmy Carter in 1976. Carter would narrowly win the county in 1980, marking the first time Cumberland had diverged from the rest of Maine in a presidential election, as the state would be carried by Republican nominee Ronald Reagan.

Reagan would easily carry Cumberland in his 49-state landslide re-election in 1984, however it was Maine's closest county, with Democrat Walter Mondale losing it by a relatively narrow 13.7%. In 1988, George H. W. Bush would become the last Republican, as of 2020, to carry Cumberland County at the presidential level, winning it by less than seven points. In 1992, Democrat Bill Clinton would win the county with nearly 43% of the vote against Bush and independent Ross Perot; it would be the last time a Democrat would receive less than 50% of the vote in Cumberland County in a presidential election. In 2004, Cumberland would become the most Democratic county in Maine, a position it has retained through 2020. In 2008, over 105,000 ballots would be cast for the Democratic candidate, Barack Obama; it would be the first time a candidate received 100,000 votes in Cumberland County in history. Democrats have exceeded 100,000 votes in Cumberland in each subsequent presidential election. In 2020, Democrat Joe Biden would win Cumberland County with 66% of the vote, the most lopsided presidential election result in the county since Lyndon Johnson won 69% of the vote in 1964.

In 2012, the county voted 65% to legalize same-sex marriage.

Voter registration

|}

Communities

Cities
Portland (county seat)
South Portland
Westbrook

Towns

Baldwin
Bridgton
Brunswick
Cape Elizabeth
Casco
Chebeague Island
Cumberland
Falmouth
Freeport
Frye Island
Gorham
Gray
Harpswell
Harrison
Long Island
Naples
New Gloucester
North Yarmouth
Pownal
Raymond
Scarborough
Sebago
Standish
Windham
Yarmouth

Census-designated places

Bridgton
Brunswick
Brunswick Station
Casco
Cousins Island
Cumberland Center
Dunstan
Falmouth
Falmouth Foreside
Freeport
Gorham
Gray
Little Falls
Littlejohn Island
Naples
North Windham
Oak Hill (known as "Scarborough" prior to 2020)
Standish
Steep Falls
South Windham
Yarmouth

Other unincorporated communities
Bailey Island
Higgins Beach
North Bridgton
Orr's Island
Prouts Neck
Sebago Lake
South Casco
South Freeport
White Rock

Education
School districts include:

 Brunswick School District
 Cape Elizabeth School District
 Chebeague Island School District
 Falmouth School District
 Gorham School District
 Long Island School District
 Portland Public Schools
 Regional School Unit 05
 Regional School Unit 14
 Scarborough School District
 School Administrative District 06
 School Administrative District 15
 School Administrative District 17
 School Administrative District 55
 School Administrative District 61
 School Administrative District 51
 School Administrative District 75
 Sebago Public Schools
 South Portland School District
 Westbrook School District
 Yarmouth School District

Governor Baxter School for the Deaf, a state-owned school, is in the county.

In popular culture
The fictional town of Jerusalem's Lot, featured in the vampire novel 'Salem's Lot by Stephen King, is situated in Cumberland County. King makes passing reference to other nearby towns and cities, including Portland, Falmouth, and Westbrook.

The video game Trauma Team takes place in Cumberland County in the year 2020, referencing Portland and its Back Cove neighborhood. Neither actual hospital housed in Portland is mentioned in-game; instead, a fictional trauma center called Resurgam First Care is fabricated for the plot (in real life, Portland's city motto is "Resurgam," Latin for "I will rise again"). Two other fictional places are mentioned that reference the county name: "Cumberland College" and "Cumberland Institute of Forensic Medicine".

See also
National Register of Historic Places listings in Cumberland County, Maine

References

External links

Cumberland County government
Cumberland County on Maine.gov
Bibliography of Casco Bay

 

 
Maine counties
1760 establishments in Massachusetts
Portland metropolitan area, Maine
Populated places established in 1760